"Number One (Remember When We Danced All Night)" is a song from New Zealand singer Margaret Urlich. The song was released in early 1990 in New Zealand as the second single from her debut studio album, Safety in Numbers, and in September 1990 as the third single from the album in Australia. The song features on her 1994 live album Live.

Track listing 
CD single/7" (CBS 654981-7)
 "Number One (Remember When We Danced All Night)" – 4:10
 "Room That Echoes" – 3:10

12" single
 "Number One (Remember When We Danced All Night)" (extended mix) – 7:13	
 "Number One (Remember When We Danced All Night)" – 4:10
 "Room That Echoes" – 3:10

Charts

References

External links 
 Number One (Remember When We Danced All Night at Discogs

1989 songs
1990 singles
Margaret Urlich songs
CBS Records singles
Songs written by David Tyson
Songs written by Dean McTaggart